The Durgavati River, ( 𑂠𑂳𑂩𑂹𑂏𑂰𑂫𑂞𑂲 𑂢𑂠𑂹𑂠𑂲 ) (also called Durgaoti or Durgauti and spelt as Durgawati) which flows through Kaimur district in the Indian state of  Bihar, is a tributary of the Karmanasa.

Course
It runs nearly north for about  when it plunges down the rocky boundary of the table land in to the head of deep glen named Kadhar Kho. There it is joined by three other torrents that like itself rise on the table land of the Turkan Kharawars and fall down the rocks at the head of the same glen. These three torrents are the Lohara, Hatiyadub and Kothas. The Durgavati joins the Karmanasa as a right bank tributary.

Waterfalls

Durgavati Reservoir
The Durgavati Reservoir, also known as Karamchat Dam is a water storage Dam located near Karamchat village in Kaimur district. The foundation stone for the project was laid in 1976 by Jagjivan Ram, who was a Union minister at the time. It can be reached via Sasaram to Kudra-Chenari-Malahipur road.

See also
Dharmawati River
Durgavati Canal
Chausa Canal

References

Rivers of Bihar
Rivers of India